A by-election was held in the Vaisigano No.1 constituency in Samoa in May 2010.  The by-election was precipitated by the disqualification from the Legislative Assembly of Va'ai Papu Vailupe for joining the Tautua Samoa Party, and was scheduled for 14 May, However, the Human Rights Protection Party did not stand a candidate, resulting in Va'ai being elected unopposed.

Candidates
 Va'ai Papu Vailupe (Tautua Samoa Party)

References

By-elections to the Legislative Assembly of Samoa
2010 elections in Oceania
2010 in Samoa